Elemér Pászti (born 20 December 1889 in Szolnok – 27 October 1965 in Budapest) was a Hungarian gymnast who competed at the 1912 Summer Olympics and the 1928 Summer Olympics.

He was part of the Hungarian team, which won the silver medal in the gymnastics men's team, European system event in 1912. In the individual all-around competition he finished 13th.

References

External links
profile 

1889 births
1965 deaths
People from Szolnok
Hungarian male artistic gymnasts
Gymnasts at the 1912 Summer Olympics
Gymnasts at the 1928 Summer Olympics
Olympic gymnasts of Hungary
Olympic silver medalists for Hungary
Olympic medalists in gymnastics
Medalists at the 1912 Summer Olympics
Sportspeople from Jász-Nagykun-Szolnok County
20th-century Hungarian people